Foolad Yazd Football Club is an Iranian football club based in Yazd, Iran. They currently compete in the Azadegan League. The team was founded in 2004.

Season-by-season
The table below chronicles the achievements of Foolad Yazd  in various competitions since 2004.

Club managers
  Dinko Jeličić (2014–2015)
  Reza Shirdel (Aug 2015– )

References

External links
 Official website

Football clubs in Iran
Sport in Yazd Province
2004 establishments in Iran
Association football clubs established in 2004
Yazd